Srđan Golubović (born August 24, 1972) is a Serbian film director.

Biography
Golubović's father was a film director Predrag Golubović. His first feature film Absolute 100  participated in main programs of over thirty international film festivals, including Cottbus, Rotterdam, Thessaloniki, Toronto and San Sebastian, winning 10 international and 19 domestic awards. His second feature film Klopka ("The Trap") had its world premiere at the Berlinale in 2007.  The film has won a total of 21 international awards and was shortlisted for the Oscar in Best Foreign Language Film category.

Along with a team of young film artists, Golubović is the main vehicle behind the production company Baš Celik, making music videos for a number of established local music artists, as well as commercials and marketing campaigns.

He is an assistant professor of Film Directing at The Faculty of Dramatic Arts in Belgrade.

His 2013 film Circles has been selected as the Serbian entry for the Best Foreign Language Film at the 86th Academy Awards.

Awards
International awards: Thessaloniki Film Festival (Audience Award for The Best Foreign Film, Best Actor Award), Shaken's Stars, Cottbus Film Festival, Festival Du Film De Paris (Best Actor), Grenzland Filmtage, Teplice Film Festival (Golden Key For Best Cinematography), Palic International Film Festival (Silver Tower For the Best Film).

Filmography

References

External links
 Bas Celik Productions
 Srdan Golubović: Sanjam Zlatnu palmu at novosti.rs
 

Serbian film directors
Living people
1972 births
Film people from Belgrade
University of Belgrade Faculty of Dramatic Arts alumni